Pselliophora is a genus of true crane fly.

Species

P. annulipes Enderlein, 1921
P. annulosa (van der Wulp, 1884)
P. approximata Brunetti, 1918
P. ardens (Wiedemann, 1821)
P. aurantia Brunetti, 1918
P. bakeri Alexander, 1925
P. biaurantia Alexander, 1938
P. bicinctifer Alexander, 1922
P. bicolor Edwards, 1925
P. bifascipennis Brunetti, 1911
P. binghami Edwards, 1921
P. brunnipennis Edwards, 1926
P. cavaleriei Alexander, 1923
P. chaseni Edwards, 1932
P. chrysophila (Walker, 1856)
P. compedita (Wiedemann, 1821)
P. ctenophorina Riedel, 1913
P. curvipes van der Wulp, 1884
P. dendrobia Edwards, 1932
P. divisa Brunetti, 1911
P. dolens (Osten Sacken, 1882)
P. enderleini (Alexander & Alexander, 1973)
P. fasciipennis Enderlein, 1921
P. flammipes Edwards, 1926
P. flavibasis Edwards, 1916
P. flavifemur Enderlein, 1921
P. flavofasciata Brunetti, 1918
P. flavostigma Alexander, 1924
P. fumiplena (Walker, 1856)
P. fuscipennis (Macquart, 1846)
P. fuscolimbata Alexander, 1938
P. galeata Alexander, 1921
P. gaudens (Walker, 1859)
P. gloria Alexander, 1924
P. guangxiensis Yang & Yang, 1988
P. hainanensis Yang & Yang, 1988
P. harmandi Alexander, 1924
P. henryi Edwards, 1927
P. hoffmanni Alexander, 1932
P. hoppo Matsumura, 1916
P. idalia (Osten Sacken, 1882)
P. igorota Alexander, 1923
P. immaculipennis Brunetti, 1911
P. incunctans (Walker, 1859)
P. insignis de Meijere, 1904
P. invenustipes Alexander, 1932
P. isshikii (Matsumura, 1916)
P. jinxiuensis Yang & Yang, 1988
P. jubilata Alexander, 1938
P. kangeanensis Alexander, 1938
P. kershawi Alexander, 1923
P. koreana Masaki, 1939
P. ladelli Edwards, 1932
P. laeta (Fabricius, 1794)
P. laneipes Edwards, 1921
P. latifascipennis Brunetti, 1918
P. lauta Alexander, 1936
P. longicornis de Meijere, 1924
P. longshengensis Yang & Yang, 1988
P. luctuosa de Meijere, 1916
P. margarita (Alexander, 1965)
P. mcgregori Alexander, 1925
P. mecocera (Alexander, 1970)
P. mesamericana Alexander, 1944
P. nigribasis Edwards, 1921
P. nigrithorax van der Wulp, 1904
P. nigrorum Alexander, 1929
P. ningmingensis Yang & Yang, 1988
P. ophionea Edwards, 1921
P. pachyrhinoides Edwards, 1932
P. pallitibia Yang & Yang, 1988
P. pendleburyi Edwards, 1928
P. penicillata Edwards, 1928
P. perdecora Alexander, 1922
P. plagiata Edwards, 1926
P. praefica Bezzi, 1916
P. pumila Alexander, 1922
P. reversa Edwards, 1921
P. rubella Edwards, 1923
P. rubra Osten Sacken, 1887
P. scalator Alexander, 1920
P. scurra Alexander, 1941
P. sikkimensis Enderlein, 1921
P. speciosa Edwards, 1916
P. stabilis Alexander, 1936
P. sternoloba Alexander, 1938
P. stigmatica van der Wulp, 1904
P. strigipennis de Meijere, 1914
P. suspirans (Osten Sacken, 1882)
P. taprobanes (Walker, 1848)
P. terminalis Brunetti, 1911
P. tigriventris Alexander, 1925
P. tinctipennis Edwards, 1932
P. tripudians Bezzi, 1916
P. upsilon Alexander, 1938
P. venezuelensis Alexander, 1944
P. vulcan Alexander, 1923
P. xanthopimplina Enderlein, 1921

References

Tipulidae